Ira (also Romanized as Īrā) is a village in Lavasan-e Bozorg Rural District, Lavasanat District, Shemiranat County, Tehran Province, Iran. At the 2006 census, its population was 106, in 37 families.

The natives of Ira, alike the rest of the Lavasanat district, are of Caspian origin, and the local dialect or vernacular of the natives is a mix of Persian and Caspian. In the village of Ira (as well as Veskara), this vernacular approaches Mazandarani.

References

Sources  
 

Populated places in Shemiranat County